Actinoporidae is a family of bryozoans belonging to the order Cyclostomatida.

Genera:
 Actinopora d'Orbigny, 1853

References

Bryozoan families